Tayan is a village in Batken Region of Kyrgyzstan. It is part of the Batken District. Its population was 1,693 in 2021.

Nearby towns and villages include Gaz and Bujum.

References

External links 
Satellite map at Maplandia.com

Populated places in Batken Region